This page lists the films composed by Ilaiyaraaja in the 1990s.

Ilaiyaraaja 1990

Ilaiyaraaja 1991

Ilaiyaraaja 1992

Ilaiyaraaja 1993

Ilaiyaraaja 1994

Ilaiyaraaja 1995

Ilaiyaraaja 1996

Ilaiyaraaja 1997

Ilaiyaraaja 1998

Ilaiyaraaja 1999

See also

References

External links
 
 Raaja.com: The official Internet website of Ilaiyaraaja
 Collection of Ilayaraja songs at Paadal.com
 Collection of Ilayaraja Songs, Videos, Images and BGM

Indian songs
Discographies
Discographies of Indian artists